Thomas George Francis (20 October 1920 – April 1996) was an English footballer who played as a goalkeeper.

Career
Francis began his career with non-league club Cheltenham Town in 1938, however Francis' time at Cheltenham was interrupted by World War II. In 1946, Francis signed for Millwall, making a single Football League appearance during his time at the club. In 1947, Francis joined Chelmsford City. In the 1948–1949 season, Francis temporarily lost his place to Lew Collins, regaining it back for an FA Cup tie away to Guildford City on 13 November 1948. Francis left Chelmsford in April 1949.

References

1920 births
1996 deaths
Association football goalkeepers
English footballers
Footballers from Bermondsey
Cheltenham Town F.C. players
Millwall F.C. players
Chelmsford City F.C. players
English Football League players
Southern Football League players